Joseph Breckinridge may refer to:

 Joseph Cabell Breckinridge (1788–1823), Speaker of the Kentucky House of Representatives 1817–1819 and Kentucky Secretary of State 1820–1823
 Joseph Cabell Breckinridge Sr. (1842–1920), soldier in the American Civil War and the Spanish–American War
 Joseph Cabell Breckinridge Jr. (1872–1898), soldier killed in the Spanish–American War

See also
Breckinridge family